Henri Laaksonen was the defending champion but lost in the first round to Evan Furness.

Grégoire Barrère won the title after defeating Quentin Halys 4–6, 6–3, 6–4 in the final.

Seeds

Draw

Finals

Top half

Bottom half

References

External links
Main draw
Qualifying draw

Open d'Orléans - 1
2022 Singles